Afabet Subregion is a subregion in the Northern Red Sea (Zoba Semienawi Keyih Bahri) region of Eritrea. Its capital lies at Afabet.

References

Awate.com: Martyr Statistics

Northern Red Sea Region
Subregions of Eritrea